The Cumpăna is a left tributary of the river Topolog in Romania. It flows into the Topolog north of Sălătrucu.

References

Rivers of Romania
Rivers of Argeș County